The Ring magazine was established in 1922. In 1954, the magazine established its own boxing Hall of Fame and inducted 155 members before it was abandoned after the 1987 inductions. Boxing inductions continue through the International Boxing Hall of Fame. 142 members of the old The Ring magazine Hall of Fame have been elected to the International Boxing Hall of Fame since 1990. The 13 members who have yet to be elected to the International Boxing Hall of Fame are listed below, with their year of induction into The Ring Boxing Hall of Fame:

Modern Group
 1973Gus Lesnevich
 1977Ceferino Garcia
 1977Yoshio Shirai

Old-Timers
 1976Jimmy Britt
 1978Peter Maher
 1982Harry Jeffra

Pioneers
 1962Ned Price
 1964Sam Collyer 
 1968Jacob Hyer
 1971Nobby Clark
 1972Tom Chandler

Non-Participant
 1977Dan Daniel

External links

Awards established in 1954
Awards disestablished in 1987
Boxing museums and halls of fame
Hall of fame
Halls of fame in New York (state)